The Great Mosque of Porto-Novo is a mosque in Porto-Novo, Ouémé Department, Benin.

History
The construction of the mosque started in 1912 and completed in 1925 during the French Dahomey. It was recently declared a historical monument by Porto-Novo city government.

Architecture
The Afro-Brazilians architectural-style mosque was constructed resembling a chapel with a long central hall and shallow vaulted roof. The front facade is decorated with floral, vegetable and scrolled stucco molding.

See also
 List of mosques in Benin

References

1925 establishments in French Dahomey
Afro-Brazilian architecture
Buildings and structures in Porto-Novo
Brazilian diaspora in Africa
Mosques completed in 1925
Mosques in Benin